Facial tissue and paper handkerchief refers to a class of soft, absorbent, disposable papers that are suitable for use on the face. They are disposable alternatives for cloth handkerchiefs. The terms are commonly used to refer to the type of paper tissue, usually sold in boxes, that is designed to facilitate the expulsion of nasal mucus from the nose (nose-blowing) although it may refer to other types of facial tissues such as napkins and wipes.

Facial tissues are often referred to simply as "tissues", or (in Canada and the United States) by the generic trademark "Kleenex", which popularized the invention and its use outside of Japan.

Manufacture
Facial tissue and paper handkerchiefs are made from the lowest basis weights tissue paper (14–18 g/m2). The surface is often made smoother by light calendering. These paper types consist usually of 2–3 plies. Because of high quality requirements the base tissue is normally made entirely from pure chemical pulp, but might contain added selected recycled fiber. The tissue paper might be treated with softeners, lotions or added perfume to get the right properties or "feeling". The finished facial tissues or handkerchiefs are folded and put in pocket-size packages or a box dispenser.

Facial tissue may contain non-biodegradable additives for strength.

History

Facial tissue has been used for centuries in Japan, in the form of washi or Japanese tissue, as described in this 17th-century European account of the voyage of Hasekura Tsunenaga:

"They blow their noses in soft silky papers the size of a hand, which they never use twice, so that they throw them on the ground after usage, and they were delighted to see our people around them precipitate themselves to pick them up."

In 1924, facial tissues as they are known today were first introduced by Kimberly-Clark as Kleenex. It was invented as a means to remove cold cream. Early advertisements linked Kleenex to Hollywood makeup departments and sometimes included endorsements from movie stars (Helen Hayes and Jean Harlow) who used Kleenex to remove their theatrical makeup with cold cream. It was the customers that started to use Kleenex as a disposable handkerchief, and a reader review in 1926 by a newspaper in Peoria, Illinois found that 60% of the users used it for blowing their nose. The other 40% used it for various reasons, including napkins and toilet paper.

Kimberly-Clark also introduced pop-up, colored, printed, pocket, and 3-ply facial tissues.

Tissue paper segmentation by application
Application wise segmentation
 
 At home (AH)
 Away from home (AFH)
 Parent Rolls

Leading global players

The leading global players in Facial Tissue Market are: 
 Procter and Gamble
 Seventh Generation
 Wonder
 Kimberly-Clark
 SCA
 Asia Pulp and Paper
 Hengan International
 Vinda International
 Georgia-Pacific
 Sofidel Group
 WEPA Group
 Metsa Group
 CMPC Tissue
 Industrie Cartarie Tronchetti (ICT)
 Kruger
 Cascades
 CandS Paper
 Sallettalen y Briand s.l (sbpapel)

Notable brands in USA

 Puffs
 Kleenex
 Scotties
 Seventh Generation
 Fiora
 Nice 'N Soft
 Marcal
 Green Forest

Notable brands outside USA
 Renova (brand)

See also
 Handkerchief
 Tissue paper

References

External links
 

Personal hygiene products
Paper products
Domestic implements

de:Taschentuch
fr:Mouchoir